Branchiostegus wardi, or Ward's tilefish, is a species of marine ray-finned fish, a tilefish belonging to the family Malacanthidae. It is found from Australia to New Caledonia and Papua New Guinea.

Etymology
The fish is named in honor of Alec Ward. He worked on trawlers in fairly 
deep water over the continental shelf and being a friend of the describer, he collected the type specimen and many other rare and interesting fishes while on board.

References

Dooley, J.K. and J.R. Paxton, 1975. A new species of tilefish (family Branchiostegidae) from eastern Australia. Proc. Linn. Soc. New South Wales 99(3):151-156. 

Malacanthidae
Taxa named by Gilbert Percy Whitley
Fish described in 1932